"Child of Our Time" was an American television play broadcast on February 5, 1959 as part of the CBS television series, Playhouse 90.  The cast included Robert L. Crawford Jr., Liliane Montevecchi, and Maximillian Schell. George Roy Hill was the director. The teleplay was written by Irving Gaynor Neiman as an adaptation of the book by Michel del Castillo.

Plot
A young Spanish boy, Tanguy, is deprived of childhood by World War II. He is left in France when his mother returns to Spain to oppose the Franco regime.

Cast
The cast included the following:

 Robert L. Crawford Jr. - Tanguy
 Liliane Montevecchi - the Mother
 Maximilian Schell - Gunther
 George Dolenz - the Father
 Lou Jacobi - Delivol
 Marc Lawrence - Pardo
 Theo Marcuse - Rouge
 [[John Wengraf - Mr. Cohen
 Ben-Ari - Misha
 Orlando Rodriguez - Firmin
 Rene Korper - Guy
 Naomi Stevens - Nita
 Felipe Turich - the Doctor
 Beppy Devries - the Concierge
 Voytek Dolinski - Antoine
 Guy De Vestel - Dulac
 Peter Coe - Prison Camp NCO
 Harold Dyrenforth - Nazi Interrogator
 Norbert Schiller - Prisoner
 Edgar Barrier - the Mayor
 Bob Duggan - Gendarme
 Armand Alzamora]] - Underground Agent
 Jean Del Val - Inspector
 Joyce Vanderveen - Red Cross Worker
 Jerry Gaylor - Red Cross Worker
 Bill Schram - Guard
 Otto Reichow - Soldier
 Sam Capano - Cast, Gendarme
 Paul Maxwell - Gendarme
 David Colmans - Maderas
 Pat Ortiz - Chato

Production
The program aired on February 19, 1959, on the CBS television series Playhouse 90. George Roy Hill was the director. The teleplay was written by Irving Gaynor Neiman as an adaptation of the book by Michel del Castillo.

References

1959 American television episodes
Playhouse 90 (season 3) episodes
1959 television plays